Kari Solem (born 1 December 1974) is a Norwegian handball player who played for the club Byåsen IL and the Norwegian national team in the 1990s. She was born in Trondheim. She competed at the 1996 Summer Olympics in Atlanta, where the Norwegian team finished fourth.

References

External links

Norwegian female handball players
Handball players at the 1996 Summer Olympics
Olympic handball players of Norway
Sportspeople from Trondheim
1974 births
Living people